Surin Khong Chee Mool Football Club (Thai สโมสรฟุตบอลสุรินทร์ โขงชีมูล), is a Thai professional football club based in Mueang, Surin, Thailand. The club is currently playing in the Thai League 3 Northeastern region.

History
In 2017, the club was established with the name Khong Chee Mool Football Club and competed in the 2017 Thailand Amateur League Northeastern region, using the stadium of Rajamangala University of Technology Isan, Surin Campus as the ground. At the end of the season, they have promoted to the 2018 Thai League 4.

In 2018, the club become a professional football club and was renamed Surin Sugar Khong Chee Mool Football Club. They competed in the Thai League 4 for the 2018 season. The club has finished eighth place in the league of the Northeastern region.

In 2019, the 2019 season is the second consecutive season in the Thai League 4 of Surin Sugar Khong Chee Mool. The club has finished sixth place in the league of the Northeastern region.

In 2020, the Football Association of Thailand merged the Thai League 3 and Thai League 4. As a result of this incident, all teams in Thai League 4 were promoted to Thai League 3. The club renamed Surin Khong Chee Mool Football Club and competed in the Thai League 3 for the 2020–21 season. In late December 2020, the Coronavirus disease 2019 or also known as COVID-19 had spread again in Thailand, the FA Thailand must abruptly end the regional stage of the Thai League 3. The club has finished the seventh place of the Northeastern region. In the 2020 Thai League Cup, Surin Khong Chee Mool competed in the tournament, they defeated Ubon Kruanapat in the first qualification round. However, the FA Thailand must cancel the Thai League Cup this year due to the spreading of COVID-19.

In 2021, the 2021–22 season is the second consecutive season in the Thai League 3 of Surin Khong Chee Mool. They started the season with a 1–1 home drawn to Yasothon and they ended the season with a 2–2 away drawn to the Yasothon. The club has finished twelfth place in the league of the Northeastern region. In addition, in the 2021–22 Thai League Cup Surin Khong Chee Mool was defeated 3–5 in a penalty shoot-out by Mahasarakham in the second qualification round, causing them to be eliminated.

In 2022, the 2022–23 season is the third consecutive season in the Thai League 3 of Surin Khong Chee Mool.

Stadium and locations

Season by season record

P = Played
W = Games won
D = Games drawn
L = Games lost
F = Goals for
A = Goals against
Pts = Points
Pos = Final position

QR1 = First Qualifying Round
QR2 = Second Qualifying Round
R1 = Round 1
R2 = Round 2
R3 = Round 3
R4 = Round 4

R5 = Round 5
R6 = Round 6
QF = Quarter-finals
SF = Semi-finals
RU = Runners-up
W = Winners

Players

Current squad

Coaching staff

References

External links
 Thai League official website

Association football clubs established in 2017
Football clubs in Thailand
Surin province
2017 establishments in Thailand